Passalotis is a genus of moth in the family Cosmopterigidae. It contains only one species, Passalotis irianthes, is found in Taiwan.

References

External links
Natural History Museum Lepidoptera genus database

Cosmopteriginae